Hepatica transsilvanica, called the large blue hepatica, is a species of flowering plant in the genus Hepatica, native to the Carpathian Mountains of Romania. It has gained the Royal Horticultural Society's Award of Garden Merit.

References

transsilvanica
Endemic flora of Romania
Plants described in 1850